Elections to Stevenage Council were held on 1 May 2008. One third of the council was up for election; the seats which were last contested in 2004. The Labour Party stayed in overall control of the council.

The election saw the Conservative party gain 3 seats but the Labour party remained firmly in control of the council.

After the election, the composition of the council was:
Labour 30
Conservative 5
Liberal Democrat 3
United Kingdom Independence Party 1

Election result

Ward results

Bandley Hill

Bedwell

Chells

Longmeadow

Manor

Martins Wood

Old Town

Pin Green

Roebuck

St Nicholas

Shephall

Symonds Green

Woodfield

References

2008 Stevenage election result
Ward results
Tories gain seats in Stevenage
Video: Stevenage election results

2008
2008 English local elections
2000s in Hertfordshire